Homero Laddaga (born 10 September 1941) is a Mexican former sports shooter. He competed in the 25 metre pistol event at the 1972 Summer Olympics.

References

1941 births
Living people
Mexican male sport shooters
Olympic shooters of Mexico
Shooters at the 1972 Summer Olympics
Place of birth missing (living people)
Pan American Games medalists in shooting
Pan American Games bronze medalists for Mexico
Shooters at the 1963 Pan American Games
20th-century Mexican people